Cnephasia latomana is a species of moth in the family Tortricidae first described by Edward Meyrick in 1885. However the placement of this species within the genus Cnephasia is in doubt.  As a result, this species may be referred to as Cnephasia (s.l.) latomana. This species is endemic to New Zealand.

References

latomana
Moths described in 1885
Moths of New Zealand
Endemic fauna of New Zealand
Taxa named by Edward Meyrick
Endemic moths of New Zealand